Rising is an unincorporated community in Champaign County, Illinois, United States. Rising is northwest of Champaign.

References

Unincorporated communities in Champaign County, Illinois
Unincorporated communities in Illinois